In basketball, an assist is a pass to a teammate that directly leads to a score by field goal. The Basketball League Belgium Division I's assist title is awarded to the player with the highest assists per game average in a given regular season.

Leaders

Notes

References

External links
Ethias League seasons at Eurobasket.com

assists